The eighth race of the 2006–07 A1 Grand Prix season was held on 25 February 2007 in Durban, South Africa.

Results
The Sprint Race took place on Sunday, 25 February 2007.

Feature Race results
The Feature Race took place on Sunday, 25 February 2007

References

South Africa
A1 Grand Prix